Minona Corona is a corona found on the planet Venus at . It is located in quadrangle V-27 (Ulfrun Regio) and was named after the Beninese goddess Minona, who grants fertility to both women and the land.

Geography and Geology 

References 

Surface features of Venus